The torrent salamanders or Cascade salamanders are a family of salamanders (Rhyacotritonidae) with only one genus, Rhyacotriton. The torrent salamanders are endemic to the United States in the Pacific Northwest (including northwestern California).

Species
The genus Rhyacotriton includes four species:
Cascade torrent salamander (R. cascadae)
Columbia torrent salamander (R. kezeri)
Olympic torrent salamander (R. olympicus)
Southern torrent salamander (R. variegatus)

Taxonomy
Originally the genus Rhyacotriton was placed in the family Ambystomatidae, later in the family Dicamptodontidae, and finally in 1992 it was placed into a family of its own. At the same time the only species Rhyacotriton olympicus was split into four species due to genetic analysis.

References

 
Taxa named by Emmett Reid Dunn